is a professional Japanese baseball player. He plays infielder for the Tokyo Yakult Swallows.

External links

 NPB.com

1995 births
Living people
Baseball people from Shiga Prefecture
Japanese baseball players
Nippon Professional Baseball infielders
Yomiuri Giants players
Tokyo Yakult Swallows players